Gaoyi Township ( is a rural township in Huitong County, Hunan, China. It is surrounded by Ruoshui Town on the northwest, Tuanhe Town on the southwest, Jinziyan Township on the south, Matang Township on the southeast, and Longchuantang Township on the northeast.

Administrative division
As of 2016, it has 17 villages: Sanzhou Village, Tangzhou Village, Wangtang Village, Shuangtan Village, Lingtou Village, Shanggao Village, Wengjiang Village, Shangdashi Village, Hongguang Village, Hongpo Village, Xuefeng Village, Gaolian Village, Huaijian Village, Wengtao Village, Wenggao Village, Dengjia Village and Gaoyi Village.

Economy
Gaoyi Township's economy is dominated by tourism and special local products, such as vivipara, fish, orange, peach, bacon, chili sauce, embroidery, and bamboo weaving.

Geography
The Wu River flows through the township.

Culture
Nuo opera is the most influence local theater.

Transportation
Provincial Highway S222 runs through the township.

Attractions
Gaoyi Village, also known as "Gaoyi Ancient Village", is a famous scenic spot in Hunan. The village has been designated as a "Major National Historical and Cultural Site in Hunan" by the State Council of China.

References

Divisions of Huitong County
Townships of Huaihua